Conus parascalaris is a species of sea snail, a marine gastropod mollusk in the family Conidae, the cone snails and their allies.

Like all species within the genus Conus, these snails are predatory and venomous. They are capable of "stinging" humans, therefore live ones should be handled carefully or not at all.

Description 
Original description: "Shell thin, fragile, elongated; spire elevated, protracted, scalariform; shoulder sharply angled; body whorl smooth, polished; anterior end with numerous fine, incised sulci; color white, overlaid with closely-packed, thin, vertical, pale tan flammules; spire with scattered tan, crescent-shaped flammules; interior of aperture white; periostracum thin, pale tan, with tufts along shoulder."

The maximum recorded shell length is 23 mm.

Distribution
Locus typicus: "Gulf of Venezuela,
off Punto Fijo, Falcon, Venezuela."

This species occurs in the Caribbean Sea off Venezuela at a depth of 35 m.

Habitat 
Minimum recorded depth is 35 m. Maximum recorded depth is 35 m.

References

 Petuch, E. J. 1987. New Caribbean Molluscan Faunas. 112, plate 25, figure 14-15
 Tucker J.K. & Tenorio M.J. (2009) Systematic classification of Recent and fossil conoidean gastropods. Hackenheim: Conchbooks. 296 pp.
  Puillandre N., Duda T.F., Meyer C., Olivera B.M. & Bouchet P. (2015). One, four or 100 genera? A new classification of the cone snails. Journal of Molluscan Studies. 81: 1–23

External links
 The Conus Biodiversity website
 

parascalaris
Gastropods described in 1987